Canadian labour law is that body of law which regulates the rights, restrictions, and obligations of trade unions, workers, and employers in Canada.

Regulatory framework
The federal, provincial, and territorial governments all regulate labour and employment law in Canada, with the federal government regulating a few particular economic sectors and the provinces and territories regulating all others. The constitution gives exclusive federal jurisdiction over employment as a component of its regulatory authority for specific industries, including banking, radio and TV broadcasting, inland and maritime navigation and shipping, inland and maritime fishing, as well as any form of transportation that crosses provincial boundaries (essentially aviation and rail transport but not highways). Employment outside of federally regulated industries falls under provincial authority for most civil (including contract) law. Territories generally have similar powers as provinces but by those powers are delegated by federal statute (not constitutionally guaranteed), can be less extensive in scope, differ for each of the three territories, are subject to change accruing over time, and also interact to a large extent with Inuit, Métis and First Nations governments. Unless under federal jurisdiction, the laws which are in affect are those of the province or territory where the employment takes place (rather than the employee's home or the employer's head office).

Canada's varied labour laws are a result of its geography, historical, and cultural variety.  This expressed in law through the treaty-/land-based rights of individual indigenous nations, the distinct French-derived law system of Quebec, and the differing labour codes of each of the provinces and territories.

In areas of exclusive provincial jurisdiction, each province (and increasingly each territory) has authority to regulate .  So, for example, education (except education on First Nation reserves) and municipal government are both subject to provincial legislation (the territories excepted).

While Quebec's statutory environment is considerably different in many respects, most provinces and the federal Code all follow the standard of enterprise-based bargaining structures.  They also share a certification process (the details of which differ somewhat from province to province) through which unions are recognized by the state as having the support of a majority of workers in a narrowly defined workplace.

One feature common to all provincial and federal labour laws is the "Rand Formula".  This legal concept allows employees in unionized workplaces to decline union membership, but requires them to pay the equivalent of basic union dues even if they decide not to be union members.

Strikes
The right of workers to strike and picket against their employer is constitutionally protected in Canada, according to a 2015 Supreme Court of Canada ruling.

Picketing
The law concerning the granting of injunctions that limit picketing during strikes varies from province to province, and is largely case law rather than statutory.

British Columbia
In 2002, the British Columbia government changed the Employment Standards Branch, replacing the investigation system that used to reply to labour law violations with an 18-page "Self-Help Kit" and mediation process. However, this has been criticized as changing the government's role "from enforcers of labour standards to being wage dispute resolvers."

Health Services and Support-Facilities Subsector Bargaining Association v British Columbia [2007]
Fraser v. Ontario (Attorney General) [2011]

See also
 Canada Labour Code
 Employment Standards Act of British Columbia
 Employment Standards Act (Ontario)
UK labour law
United States labor law

References

 
Economy of Canada
Labour law by country